Francis Lopez (1916–1995) was a French composer of film scores. He also wrote a number of operettas, many of which starred  Luis Mariano. He was married several times including to the actress Sylvia Lopez.

Selected filmography

 The Black Cavalier (1945)
 Alone in the Night (1945)
 The Three Cousins (1947)
 Fandango (1949)
 Marlene (1949)
 Eve and the Serpent (1949)
 I Like Only You (1949)
 The Red Angel (1949)
 The Dream of Andalusia (1951)
 Rendezvous in Grenada (1951)
 Monsieur Leguignon, Signalman (1952)
 Imperial Violets (1952)
 The Blonde Gypsy (1953)
 Their Last Night (1953)
 The Cheerful Caravan (1953)
 Saluti e baci (1953)
 The Beauty of Cadiz (1953)
 The Lady of the Camellias (1953)
 Adventures of the Barber of Seville (1954)
 Four Days in Paris (1955)
 Love in Jamaica (1957)
 Irresistible Catherine (1957)
 A Night at the Moulin Rouge (1957)
 The Singer from Mexico (1957)
 Serenade of Texas (1958)
 The Bureaucrats (1959)
 The Game of Truth (1961)

References

Bibliography
 Creekmur, Corey & Mokdad, Linda. The International Film Musical. Edinburgh University Press, 2012.
 Powrie, Phil & Cadalanu, Marie . The French Film Musical. Bloomsbury Publishing, 2020.

External links

1916 births
1995 deaths
People from  Montbéliard
French composers